Buyende is a town in the Eastern Region of Uganda. It is the main municipal, administrative, and commercial centre of Buyende District.

Location

The coordinates of the town are:1°08'51.0"N, 33°09'40.0"E (Latitude:1.147500; Longitude:33.161111).

Population
In 2014, the national population census put the population of Buyende town at 23,039

Points of interest
The following points of interest lie within the town limits or close to the edges of the town:
 headquarters of Buyende District Administration
 offices of Buyende Town Council
 Buyende central market.

Challenges
Buyende Town attained municipality status when its home district (Buyende District), split from Kamuli District, on 1 July 2010. The town's main challenges include the following:

1. Lack of piped potable water. Buyende depends on communal boreholes for its water needs.

2. The absence of a sewerage system. There are no public toilet facilities in the town for residents and their visitors.

3. The town does not have a centralized garbage disposal system. Trash was observed to be strewed across public spaces in 2013.

4. Inadequate distribution of grid network electricity, with 80 percent of the residents dependent on kerosene lamps for lighting.

5. Domestic animals, including cattle, goats, sheep, and chicken roam freely in town without any restriction.

See also
Busoga
Basoga
List of cities and towns in Uganda

References

Buyende District
Busoga
Eastern Region, Uganda 
Populated places in Uganda
Cities in the Great Rift Valley